A Control Display Unit (CDU) is used in remote operated gasfields placed on the seabed.
It distributes power, control signals and chemicals arriving through the umbilical and pipelines from land to the other sub-sea structures.
The connection point – manifold – in the control distribution unit can be retrieved to the surface for maintenance and modifications.

Other uses
It is also used as the name of 'the interface device unit' used to access the flight management computers (FMC), the main computers and software seen in larger aircraft, especially airliners such as Boeing 737, 767, and 777.

 is the interface device unit used to access the Flight Management Computers (FMC), the main computers and software of larger aircraft. CDUs are mostly seen on airliners, like the Boeing 777.

References

Display technology
Oilfield terminology